The Violin Concerto No. 1 is a composition for solo violin and orchestra by the Finnish composer Magnus Lindberg.  The work was commissioned by the Mostly Mozart Festival and was composed in 2006.  It was given its world premiere at Avery Fisher Hall on August 22, 2006 by the violinist Lisa Batiashvili and the Mostly Mozart Festival Orchestra under the direction of Louis Langrée.

Composition
The violin concerto has a duration of roughly 27 minutes and is composed in three numbered movements.

Instrumentation
The work is scored for solo violin and a chamber orchestra comprising two oboes, two bassoons, two horns, and strings.

Reception
The violin concerto has been praised by music critics.  Reviewing the world premiere, Allan Kozinn of The New York Times observed:
He continued, "The lengthy, riveting cadenza near the end of the work is full of beauty and surprise, and it samples the full gamut of violin technique, from pizzicato to sliding and trilling, to lush melodies in double stops. Ms. Batiashvili made the most of its showpiece qualities but also maintained its internal coherence."

Andrew Clements of The Guardian called it "one of the finest new concertos for the instrument in several decades" and wrote, "The richness and complexity of the textures that Lindberg generates from a modest, Mozartian orchestra continue to amaze..."  David Fanning of Gramophone similarly remarked, "It manages to balance substance with style, and poetry with virtuosity, in ways that can almost stand comparison with Berg (the distant but clear model for a number of its textures)."

References

Concertos by Magnus Lindberg
2006 compositions
Lindberg 1
Compositions for chamber orchestra